Dbus may refer to:

 Ü (region), a region of Tibet, rendered as "Dbus" using Wylie transliteration
 the Central Tibetan language of this province
 the Standard Tibetan language, based on a dialect of the earlier Dbus language
 D-Bus, a software communication protocol